Danuser is a surname. Notable people with the surname include:

Brigitta Danuser, Swiss academic
Christian Danuser (born 1953), Swiss biathlete
Hans Danuser (born 1953), Swiss artist and photographer
Hermann Danuser (born 1946), Swiss-German musicologist